Johan Erik Gullichsen (born 28 June 1936 in Porin maalaiskunta) is a Finnish paper engineer. From 1989 to 1999 he was professor for Pulping Technology at Helsinki University of Technology.
He is also a sailor and competed in the 1964 Summer Olympics.

Johan Gullichsen is a member of the Ahlström family. His mother was the Finnish art collector and patronage Maire Gullichsen.

References

1936 births
People from Pori
Finnish chemical engineers
Academic staff of the Helsinki University of Technology
Finnish male sailors (sport)
Olympic sailors of Finland
Sailors at the 1964 Summer Olympics – 5.5 Metre
Finnish people of Norwegian descent
Living people